The Roewe W5 is a mid-size luxury SUV manufactured by Roewe in China. It was unveiled at the 2011 Auto Shanghai Exhibition.

Overview
The Roewe W5 is based on the SsangYong Kyron and sold exclusively in China. It features a 1.8-litre, four-cylinder turbo engine with  that is also used in the Roewe 750 and 550. The car is also available in four-wheel drive format with a 3.2-litre inline-six Mercedes-Benz M104 engine producing .

References

External links
Roewe official website 

2010s cars
Cars introduced in 2011
W5
Mid-size sport utility vehicles
Luxury sport utility vehicles